Kennedy Ridge is an ice-covered ridge,  long, which is notably straight and extends west from Mount Moxley between Potter Glacier and Wirdnam Glacier, in Victoria Land, Antarctica. It was named by the Advisory Committee on Antarctic Names in 1994 after Nadene Kennedy, a Polar Coordination Specialist at the Office of Polar Programs, National Science Foundation (NSF), who was associated with the NSF Antarctic Program since 1978, including ten working visits to the continent, and at the time of naming was NSF liaison with the Antarctic tourist industry, responsible for implementing Antarctic Treaty reporting requirements and coordination of the Antarctic visitor program.

References

Ridges of the Ross Dependency
Hillary Coast